Edwin Purcell Meachen  (11 November 1895 – 11 July 1970) was a New Zealand politician of the Labour Party.

Biography

Early life and career
Meachen was born in Whanganui in 1895. He was educated at Christchurch Marist Brothers' School and worked as a builder afterwards. During World War I he served in the New Zealand Expeditionary Force. He fought in Gallipoli and France and was wounded twice.

He resumed building after the war and also represented Mid-Canterbury at rugby union (1921–23) and Canterbury at rugby league (1924). He then moved to the King Country and was employed by the Ministry of Works building bridges and houses for railways. During this time he became active in the New Zealand Workers' Union and joined the Labour Party. In 1930 he relocated to Marlborough to construct a railway camp at Wharanui.

Political career

He represented the Marlborough electorates of Wairau from 1935 to 1938, and then Marlborough from 1938 to 1946 when he was defeated. He first stood for Wairau in 1931.

Meachen was Parliamentary Under-Secretary to the Minister of Works from 1945 to 1946.

He was the Mayor of Blenheim from 1953 to 1962 and Chairman of the Marlborough Catchment Board from its inception in 1955 until his death 1970. He was appointed a Member of the Order of the British Empire, for services to the community, particularly to local government, in the 1968 Queen's Birthday Honours.

Later life and death
Meachen died in 1970 and was buried at Omaka Cemetery, Blenheim.

Notes

References

Who’s Who in New Zealand (1961, 7th edition)

New Zealand Labour Party MPs
1895 births
1970 deaths
People from Whanganui
Mayors of Blenheim, New Zealand
New Zealand MPs for South Island electorates
Members of the New Zealand House of Representatives
Unsuccessful candidates in the 1951 New Zealand general election
Unsuccessful candidates in the 1946 New Zealand general election
Unsuccessful candidates in the 1931 New Zealand general election
New Zealand Members of the Order of the British Empire
Burials at Omaka Cemetery
New Zealand military personnel of World War I
New Zealand justices of the peace